Opuntia anacantha is a species belonging to the family Cactaceae, native to northern Argentina and Bolivia.

Description 
Shrubby cactus of about 60 cm high and 2.5 wide, normally prostrate, sometimes climbs due to its adventitious roots. The dark green segments are flat, narrow and elliptical in shape, about 5 to 40 cm long and 3.5 to 7 cm wide. The areolas are small. Orange or orange yellow flowers 4 cm long.

Taxonomy 
Opuntia anacantha was described by Carlos Luis Spegazzini and published in Bulletin du Muséum d'Histoire Naturelle 1904. , Plants of the World Online regarded it as a synonym of Opuntia elata var. elata.

Etymology 
Opuntia : generic name that comes from the Greek used by Pliny the Elder for a plant that grew around the city of Opus in Greece.

anacantha : Latin epithet meaning "without thorns".

References 

anacantha
Plants described in 1904
Flora of Argentina
Flora of Bolivia
Taxa named by Carlo Luigi Spegazzini